Halgodari, also known as Khalaqdari, may refer to:
 Halgodari-ye Ashraf
 Halgodari-ye Osman